"Call Me" is a song by Italian singer Spagna, released in 1987 as the second single from her debut studio album, Dedicated to the Moon (1987). The music video for the song was filmed in and around Nottingham, England. The majority of the video was filmed in and around the Ritzy nightclub, with the nearby Belvoir Castle also featuring.

Unlike its predecessor, "Easy Lady", "Call Me" was also released in North America and Japan. A "U.S. remix" was made by Steve Thompson and Mike Barbiero. The single's B-side, "Girl, It's Not the End of the World", also appears on Spagna's debut album.

Puerto Rican singer Yolandita Monge recorded a Spanish cover of the song, titled "Por Ti", for her 1988 album Vivencias. Yolandita also made a music video to accompany this song.

Spanish singer Soraya Arnelas recorded a cover version of the song and released it as the second official single from her second studio album, Ochenta's (2006).

The song was also covered by New Zealand band The Fan Club in 1988.

Commercial performance
"Call Me" reached number one in Spain, while peaking at number two in Italy and the United Kingdom, as well as number three in Ireland. In France, the single debuted at number 40, before peaking at number four in its 10th week on the chart, and was certified silver by the Syndicat National de l'Édition Phonographique (SNEP) that same year. Elsewhere, "Call Me" charted within the top five in Finland and Norway, and the top 10 in Belgium, Sweden, Switzerland and West Germany.

In 1988, the U.S. remix of the song reached number 13 on the Hot Dance Music/Club Play chart and number 18 on the Hot Dance Music/Maxi-Singles Sales in the United States.

Track listings

7-inch single
A. "Call Me" – 4:05
B. "Girl, It's Not the End of the World" – 4:15

US and Canadian 7-inch single (U.S. remix)
A. "Call Me" (U.S. remix) – 4:05
B. "Girl, It's Not the End of the World" – 4:15

12-inch single
A. "Call Me" – 6:05
B. "Girl, It's Not the End of the World" – 5:05

UK limited-edition 12-inch single
A. "Call Me" – 6:05
B1. "Easy Lady" (Move On Up mix) – 6:40
B2. "Girl, It's Not the End of the World" – 5:05

UK 12-inch single (special Viva remix)
A1. "Call Me" (Viva mix) – 5:40
A2. "Girl, It's Not the End of the World" – 4:15
B1. "Call Me" (bonus track) – 3:45
B2. "Call Me" (instrumental) – 5:45

12-inch single (special remix)
A. "Call Me" (special remix) – 5:40
B1. "Call Me" (bonus track) – 3:45
B2. "Call Me" (instrumental) – 5:45

Australian 12-inch single (special 12″ U.S. mix)
A1. "Call Me" (Popstand remix) – 7:20
A2. "Call Me" (percapella) – 5:33
B1. "Call Me" (long distance dub) – 6:40
B2. "Call Me" (instrumental) – 5:42
B3. "Call Me" (original Euro 12″ mix) – 6:05

Japanese 12-inch single
A1. "Call Me" (Popstand remix) – 7:23
A2. "Call Me" (percapella) – 5:32
B1. "Call Me" (long distance dub) – 6:47
B2. "Call Me" (instrumental) – 5:42

Credits and personnel
 Spagna – vocals, vocal arrangements
 Larry Pignagnoli – production, arrangements
 Theo Spagna – production, arrangements
 Graziano Ferrari – photography
 Toni Contiero – artwork
 Recorded and mixed at Simple Studios (Reggio Emilia, Italy)

Charts

Weekly charts

Year-end charts

Certifications

References

1986 songs
1987 singles
CBS Records singles
Number-one singles in Spain
Songs written by Larry Pignagnoli
Spagna songs
Songs written by Giorgio Spagna